6Z or 6-Z may refer to:

6Z, IATA code for South African airline Panavia 
6Z, IATA code for Ukrainian Cargo Airways
6Z, the production code for the 1985 Doctor Who serial Revelation of the Daleks
Class 6Z locomotive; see South African Class 6A 4-6-0
Asus ZenFone 6, known as the Asus 6Z in the Indian market

See also
Z6 (disambiguation)